Samantha Linette Pearl Riley  (born 13 November 1972) is an Australian breaststroke swimmer of Aboriginal descent who competed for Australia in the 1992 Summer Olympics in Barcelona and the 1996 Summer Olympics in Atlanta, winning three medals.  She trained under Scott Volkers at the Commercial Swimming Club in Brisbane.

Having been advised as a child to begin swimming to combat asthma, the Brisbane schoolgirl broke into the Australian team for the 1991 World Championships in Perth, Western Australia, winning a silver medal in the medley relay.  The following year, Riley won a bronze medal in the 100-metre breaststroke at the 1992 Barcelona Olympics, as well as competing in the 200-metre event.

In 1994, Riley won both breaststroke events at the 1994 Commonwealth Games in Victoria, British Columbia, and repeated the feat at the 1994 World Championships in Rome, Italy, setting a world record of 1 minute, 07.69 seconds in the 100-metre event.  This prompted Swimming World magazine to name her as the Female World Swimmer of the Year.

Riley continued to sweep all before her in 1995, but arrived for the 1996 Summer Olympics under the cloud of a doping controversy. She had failed a drug test, and was only exonerated after her coach Scott Volkers admitted to giving her a headache tablet which contained the banned substance.  Under the pressure of the controversy, Riley performed well outside her personal best times, which would have been enough for gold. She collected a bronze in the 100m breaststroke. She also collected a silver medal in the 4x100-meter relay with Nicole Stevenson, Susie O'Neill and Sarah Ryan.

Riley never stood on the podium again as an individual at the world level, but maintained her position in the Australian squad. Many anticipated her to return to her peak at the 2000 Summer Olympics in Sydney, but a kidney infection disrupted her training.  She retired shortly after being Australia's most successful female breaststroke swimmer in the 1990s.

At one stage during the mid-1990s, Riley was the girlfriend of Norwegian Olympic champion speedskater Johann Olav Koss.  This sparked media speculation that he would compete for Australia at the Winter Olympics.

The major arterial Samantha Riley Drive in Kellyville is named after her. The Australian Olympic Committee recognised her in their list of Australian Indigenous Olympians.

See also 
 List of Olympic medalists in swimming (women)
 List of Commonwealth Games medallists in swimming (women)
 World record progression 100 metres breaststroke
 World record progression 200 metres breaststroke

References

External links 
 
 
 
 

1972 births
Living people
Sportswomen from Queensland
Indigenous Australian Olympians
Olympic swimmers of Australia
Swimmers at the 1992 Summer Olympics
Swimmers at the 1996 Summer Olympics
Olympic silver medalists for Australia
Olympic bronze medalists for Australia
Commercial Swimming Club swimmers
Commonwealth Games gold medallists for Australia
World record setters in swimming
Olympic bronze medalists in swimming
Australian female breaststroke swimmers
World Aquatics Championships medalists in swimming
Australian sportspeople in doping cases
Medalists at the FINA World Swimming Championships (25 m)
Doping cases in Australian swimming
Swimmers from Brisbane
Medalists at the 1996 Summer Olympics
Medalists at the 1992 Summer Olympics
Commonwealth Games silver medallists for Australia
Olympic silver medalists in swimming
Commonwealth Games medallists in swimming
Swimmers at the 1994 Commonwealth Games
Swimmers at the 1998 Commonwealth Games
Recipients of the Medal of the Order of Australia
Recipients of the Australian Sports Medal
Medallists at the 1994 Commonwealth Games
Medallists at the 1998 Commonwealth Games